Phil McCordic is a Canadian actor, host, director, producer, and writer. He has created children's programming for YTV, CBC Television, and TVOntario. 
Phil has won numerous awards, including 3 Canadian Screen Awards, one for each season of Science Max, Experiments at Large.

Kids (via their parents) are welcome to interact with him and ask him science questions on his official Facebook page or on Twitter

Filmography

References

External links
 
 
Facebook
Twitter

Living people
Canadian male voice actors
Canadian male television actors
Toronto Metropolitan University alumni
Canadian television producers
Canadian television writers
Canadian children's television personalities
University of Windsor alumni
Canadian male television writers
1973 births